Thomas Abraham is an Indian and is the founder president and chairman  of the Global Organization for People of Indian Origin (GOPIO), having previously founded the organization and served as its president. He was the Convener of the First Global Convention of People of Indian Origin held in New York, where GOPIO was formed. Earlier, Dr. Abraham served as the executive trustee of GOPIO Foundation. He is also president of Innovative Research and Products, Inc., Stamford, CT, US, a multi-client market research firm in new generation technologies specializing in advanced materials, nanotechnology, electronic components, energy generation and storage devices, etc.

Accomplishments
Dr. Abraham, born, September 11, 1948, has been influential in the NRI/PIO movement over the last four decades.  Dr. Abraham coined the word PIO (people of Indian origin) in 1989, when he put together the First Convention of People of Indian Origin in New York.  Dr. Abraham initiated several NRI/PIO Indian community institutions in the last five decades, as follows:

1.	Federation of Indian Association (FIA) of New York, New Jersey and Connecticut – 1977 (Served as president till 1981)

2.	National Federation of Indian-American Associations (NFIA) – 1980 (Served as president from 1980-'86 and as chairman 1986-'92)

3.	Global Organization for People of Indian Origin (GOPIO) – 1989 (Served as convener and president, 1989–2004; chairman 2004–2009)

4.	Indian American Kerala Cultural and Civic Center – 1993 (Served as chairman of the board from 1997 to 2004)

5.	Jagdish Bhagwati Chair for Indian Political Economy at Columbia Univ. ($4.0 million endowment) – 1992-2000 (Served as co-chairman)

6.	National Indian American Association for Senior Citizens (NIAASC) – 1998

7.	South Asian Council for Social Services (SACSS) – 2000

8.      The Indus Nanotechnology Association (TINA) – Launched Oct. 2007

Dr. Abraham was honored with Bhratvanshi Gaurav Award (Person of Indian Origin Pride) instituted by Anthar Rashtriya Sahayog Nyas (Trust for International Cooperation) and presented by former vice president Bhairon Singh Sekhawat on January 4, 2008, in New Delhi and Pravasi Bharatiya Samman (Overseas Indian Honor) award by President of India Pratibha Patil on January 9, 2008, in New Delhi. Dr. Abraham was also recognized with Distinguished Alumni Award at the 4th Convocation of the Malaviya National Institute of Technology (MNIT) in Jaipur on November 15, 2008. In 2011, the Indian Abroad at is annual award ceremony bestowed Life Time Achievement Award for Public Service to Dr. Abraham for his continued service to the Global Indian Diaspora community for four decades.

Personal
A resident of Stamford, CT (USA), Dr. Abraham stays with his wife, Dr. Susy Abraham, a retired geriatrician who worked at Sarah Neuman Rehabilitation and Health Center division Jewish Home and Hospital in Mamaroneck, New York and Hebrew Home =for the Aged Riverdale, Bronx, New York, has a daughter Nitya, associate professor of urology at Albert Einstein School of Medicine and Montefiore Health Center in the Bronx, New York and a son, Jay, who is a design engineer for new generation aircraft engines with Pratt & Whitney, East Hartford, Connecticut

References

External links
GOPIO
Innovative Research & Products homepage
NRI Online References to Thomas Abraham

1948 births
American politicians of Indian descent
Living people
Recipients of Pravasi Bharatiya Samman